The Hawk of Quraish is a symbol which is found on a number of emblems, coats of arms and flags of several states of the Arab League. The Arabs of the Arabian Peninsula, today especially those from the Arab side of the Persian Gulf coast, are traditionally falconry experts; falcons (and hawks) are seen as status symbols and are a common domesticated animal among ethnic Arabs. Also the traditions and recorded history about the Quraysh and Muhammad claim a falcon had been used as clan symbol. Therefore, several variants of the Quraishi hawk were and are seen in the flags, coat of arms, seals and emblems of several Arab states until today. In that meaning, the Hawk of Quraish is a rival to the Eagle of Saladin.

Abd ar-Rahman I, the first Umayyad emir of Córdoba, was known as the Hawk of Quraish (Saqr Quraish). According to medieval chroniclers, this was an appelation given to him by the Abbasid caliph al-Mansur, one of his greatest rivals. The Abbasids and Umayyads were both tribes of the Quraish clan, and Abd ar-Rahman had fled Damascus after the bloody and violent Abbasid Revolution, so for the Abbasid Caliph to give this appelation to the last surviving Umayyad heir was a sign of great respect.

References 

Arab history
Arab nationalist symbols
Arab League
Heraldic birds